Gützkow is a town in the District of Vorpommern-Greifswald in Mecklenburg-Vorpommern, Germany. It is situated some 15 km south of Greifswald, on the north bank of the River Peene. Gützkow was the central town of the medieval County of Gützkow.

History
The name Gützkow is derived from the Slavic Old Polabian language, as is the case of most toponyms in Mecklenburg-Vorpommern. The oldest records of the name are 1128 as "Gozgauia", 1140 Chozcho, 1163 Gozkowe, 1175 Gotzchowe, 1183 Chozkowe, 1207 Gotzkowe, 1214 Chozcowe, 1228 Gutzkowe and are derived from polabian Gost = German Gast (English "guest"), the town having had a temple, to which many guests traveled. The assumption of a person named Chockov (place of Chocek, Chocek as name-giver) is not based on facts.

Other historical earliest historical names include Gokecowe, Gotzekowe and Gotzkovborg

References

Vorpommern-Greifswald
Populated places established in the 14th century
1353 establishments in Europe